Medeon is a former municipality in Aetolia-Acarnania, West Greece, Greece. Since the 2011 local government reform it is part of the municipality Aktio-Vonitsa, of which it is a municipal unit. The municipal unit has an area of 213.217 km2. Population 3,858 (2011). The seat of the municipality was in Katouna. Medeon was named after the nearby ancient city of Medeon.

Subdivisions
The municipal unit Medeon is subdivided into the following communities (constituent villages in brackets):
Katouna (Katouna, Agios Nikolaos, Loutraki)
Aetos
Achyra
Kompoti
Konopina
Tryfos

References

Populated places in Aetolia-Acarnania